The North Dakota State Bison are the athletic teams of North Dakota State University (NDSU), which is located in the city of Fargo, North Dakota. The teams are often called the "Thundering Herd". The current logo is a bison.

Sports sponsored 

A member of the Summit League, North Dakota State University sponsors teams in eight men's and eight women's NCAA sanctioned intercollegiate sports: The football team competes as a member of the Missouri Valley Football Conference. The wrestling team competes as an affiliate member of the Big 12 Conference.

In the past, North Dakota State has been a member of the North Central Conference, the Great West Football Conference, and the United Soccer Conference. It has also been an independent.

National championships
The Bison have won twenty-nine NCAA national championships, both at the Division I and Division II levels.

Team

Individual
The Bison have won two individual event championships, all at the Division I level.

Source:

Individual sports

Football

The Bison football team, which since 1993 played their home games at the Fargodome, was a dominant force in Division II. Through January 2022, they have won 17 NCAA National titles. Eight were at the Division II level (1965, 1968, 1969, 1983, 1985, 1986, 1988, and 1990) before moving up to Division I-AA (now FCS) in 2004 where they have won nine national championships (2011, 2012, 2013, 2014, 2015, 2017, 2018, 2019, 2021). NDSU is the only team at any level of NCAA football to have won five straight national championships. The program was the winningest in the history of the NCAA Division II North Central Conference, with 17 outright championships and 27 total league football titles. The program has also been quite successful since moving up to the D1 FCS classification. In 2006 the Bison posted a 10–1 record that included a win over FBS Ball State. During a 2006 game against FBS Minnesota, NDSU led for much of the game, but a last-second field goal attempt was blocked by Minnesota, resulting in a 10–9 loss. The following season, the Bison won their first Great West Football Conference championship and achieved the number 1 ranking in major FCS polls for a majority of the season. During this season the 2007 Bison football team defeated FBS members Central Michigan University and the University of Minnesota. In 2010 the Bison defeated the FBS Kansas Jayhawks, 6–3, for their first win over a Big 12 program. The Bison won the 2011 FCS national championship, defeating Sam Houston State University, 17–6. The 2011 title was their ninth overall. The Bison returned to the FCS championship game in 2012 and soundly defeated Sam Houston State University in a rematch of the 2011 title game, 39–13. Expectations were high entering the 2013 season. The season commenced with a game against the Kansas State Wildcats, the reigning Big 12 Champions. The Bison took a quick lead, but let a 7–7 halftime score get away from them; trailing 21–7 in the third quarter. The Bison finished the game with an 18-play 80-yard drive that used  minutes, leaving 28 seconds on the clock for the Wildcats, trailing by 3. NDSU Linebacker Grant Olson intercepted the first pass attempt by the Wildcats, sealing their 7th win over FBS teams since their move to FCS. ESPN College GameDay broadcast an episode from Fargo. The Bison finished the season 15–0 with a victory over the Towson Tigers, 35–7. Despite a cast of new coaches, the 2014 Bison finished the season with a 15–1 record, including another win over Big 12 Iowa State and won their fourth consecutive national championship. ESPN College GameDay was broadcast from Fargo for the 2nd consecutive year.
In 2016, the Bison upset AP-ranked 13 Iowa at Kinnick Stadium. This still stands as NDSU's most notable win, and one of the highest profile upsets in Division I football history. Despite the impressive win, the remainder of the season would not be like the previous years for the Bison. NDSU would give up the Dakota Marker for the first time since the 2009 season. They would also see their national title streak end at five after a loss to James Madison in the semifinals at the Fargodome, who would eventually win the National Championship that season.
In the 2017 season, NDSU would return to the title game and avenge their loss the previous season, defeating James Madison in Frisco 17-13. The 2018 season would see one of the Bison's most dominant seasons, especially since 2013, when the team went 15-0 for the second time in program history. The team only played one team in a one score game (the Dakota Marker game against #3 South Dakota State), and accomplished a score differential of 28.9 points). Before the team's eventual victory over South Dakota State in the FCS semifinals, coach Chris Klieman was announced as the next head coach at Kansas State. Klieman was allowed to finish out his season at NDSU, beating SDSU in the semis and then Eastern Washington in the National Championship game.
The 2019 season started a new leaf for NDSU, with Matt Entz being announced as the next head coach for the Bison after previously serving as the team's defensive coordinator the last several seasons. As far as the on-field product was concerned, it was one of the best in program history again. With Trey Lance at the helm for the Bison in his redshirt freshman season, NDSU achieved a 16-0 record for the first time in program history and for only the second time in Division I football history (1894 Yale being the only other program to reach the mark). This was highlighted by the National Championship game win against James Madison in which NDSU won on a game-sealing interception in the redzone with under five seconds remaining. Unfortunately after the season ended, the COVID-19 pandemic hit and the 2020 FCS season was postponed to the Spring of 2021. This wouldn't be the first unfortunate thing to happen to the school in that academic year, as the football team would have a very rare year in the team's history, going 7-3 in the shortened season. The Bison also ended their national championship streak of 3 titles (between 2018 and 2020) after they lost to eventual champion Sam Houston in the FCS quarterfinals.
The 2021 season could be categorized as a "return to their roots" type season for NDSU, after the team went 14-1. The team's only loss being in the Dakota Marker game in Brookings to 4th ranked SDSU. The Bison dominated their way to their ninth national championship, beating playoff rival James Madison in the semifinals in a close game, and then beating Montana State in the title game 38-10.
However, in the 2022 season the Bison would stumble again. The team went 12-3, losing more than 1 game in a season for only the second time since 2011. NDSU lost their first game to an FBS opponent since losing to Minnesota in 2009, after they lost a three-point game at Arizona. The blows would continue as the team not only did not reclaim the Dakota Marker (losing 23-21 at home to 2nd ranked South Dakota State), but would fall to the Jackrabbits again in the National Championship game.

Men's Basketball

The Bison basketball program includes a men's and a women's team. The teams play at the Scheels Center inside the Sanford Health Athletic Complex (SHAC). They won five NCAA National Championships during the decade (1991, 1993–1996). The men's basketball team won an upset victory over the University of Wisconsin on January 21, 2006, potentially increasing its chances of being accepted into a conference. The Bison also upset Marquette University on their home court at their tournament, 64–60, on December 2, 2006.

On February 28, 2009, the Bison men's basketball team captured the Summit League regular-season championship, the school's first at the Division I level, by defeating Oral Roberts 75–72 in Tulsa, OK. Two weeks later, NDSU earned its first men's basketball NCAA berth by winning the Summit League Tournament played at Sioux Falls, SD. The Bison defeated Centenary 83–77 in the tourney quarterfinals, stopped Southern Utah 79–67 in the semifinals, and edged Oakland 66–64 in the championship game. The Bison traveled to Minneapolis for a first-round game with the defending national champions, the Kansas Jayhawks, and fell 84–74. NDSU's tournament appearance marked the first time in almost 35 years that a Division I men's program qualified for the tournament in its first season of eligibility.

2013 NDSU season highlights included a win over Notre Dame for their first ever win over an ACC team. NDSU advanced to the NCAA tournament for a 2nd time and received a #12 seed. They defeated #5 Oklahoma 80–75 in a second-round matchup of the NCAA basketball tournament and fell to San Diego State, one win short of the Sweet 16.

In 2014, NDSU won the Summit League Tournament and advanced to their 3rd NCAA basketball tournament as a #15 seed,  eventually falling to #2 seed Gonzaga 86–76.
Several years later, the Bison men's team surprised the Summit League and won the conference tournament, advancing to the NCAA tournament for the fourth time in program history. NDSU would be handed the 16 seed in the East, and was selected to play in the First Four. The Bison beat NC Central in the program's second tournament win, before falling to top-seeded Duke in the first round.

The Bison appeared ready to repeat as champions in the Summit League in the 2019-20 season. They tied South Dakota State for the regular season title, and then won the Summit League tournament for the fifth time in program history. Unfortunately, the NCAA tournament was canceled amid the COVID-19 pandemic.
NDSU would continue to appear in the conference tournament title game, but came up short in the 2020-21 season (loss to Oral Roberts) and in the 2021-22 season (loss to South Dakota State).

Women's Basketball

North Dakota State's women's basketball team is the school's only basketball team to win a national championship at any level and is the school's only other program to win at least five national titles besides the football team.
The women's basketball team was a dominant force in Division II throughout the 1990s, as the Bison won five Division II titles. However, since the school emerged from reclassification in 2008, the team has not accomplished much. 
The Bison have only made it past the quarterfinal round of the Summit League tournament three times. NDSU has also ended the season with a winning record only three times since entering Division I.
Recently, the Bison have started to change under head coach Jory Collins. In Collins' second season as Bison head coach, NDSU went 15-9 overall and 9-7 in Summit League play, as the program's third Division I season with a winning record. His time at NDSU has also featured 2 out of the program's 3 total Summit League tournament wins.

Wrestling

The Bison wrestling program had success under coach Bucky Maughan, winning four NCAA Division II team National Championships (1988, 1998, 2000, 2001). Maughan retired in 2011 after 37 years and his successor is two-time NCAA All-American Roger Kish. Kish led the 2013–14 NDSU to career highs in rankings and tournament placement since the Bison joined the Division I ranks. In 2013, NDSU earned its first D1 All American and four through 2015. The team is a member of the Big 12 Conference.

In 2023, the Bison earned their next highest ranking in their Division I era at No. 15 before losing to No. 10 Minnesota.

Volleyball
The 2008–2009 season was when the school first became fully eligible for Division I competition. In December 2008 NDSU's women's volleyball team captured the Summit League's regular season and tournament championships (doing so with a perfect league record) to become the first program at the school to earn a berth in a Division I NCAA tournament. The Bison dropped their opening round match to the University of Minnesota.

Softball

In the spring of 2009, the Bison women's softball team won the Summit League tournament in Macomb, Illinois, becoming the school's third team to appear in an NCAA tournament in the calendar year. In its opening game in May, the Bison upset 9th-ranked Oklahoma, 1–0, in an 11-inning game that spanned two days due to a weather delay. The Bison won the regional with victories over Tulsa, 3–2 and 4–1, to advance to the Super Regional (Sweet Sixteen) of the tournament, where they were eliminated.
Since that season, the Bison have reached nine more NCAA tournaments, including a streak of six straight tournaments from 2014-19. However, the team has not reached a Super Regional since 2009.
Recently, the Bison stumbled since the COVID-19 pandemic caused the 2020 season to abruptly end after just a month. NDSU has not reached the NCAA tournament since 2019, and has not won the Summit League regular season title since 2019.

Baseball

The NDSU baseball team plays their home games at Newman Outdoor Field on the north side of campus. The team has not had a large amount of success compared to their Spring counterpart: NDSU's softball team. While the Bison won three North Central Conference titles while in Division II, after the school moved up to Division I in 2008 the team has only won the Summit League twice.
The Bison advanced to their first NCAA tournament in 2014 after winning the Summit League baseball tournament for the first time. However, they would go winless in their first national appearance. Later in 2021, NDSU would win the Summit League tournament for the second time in program history, upsetting Oral Roberts to advance to the program's second NCAA tournament appearance in Division I. This time, the Bison found their first national tournament win in a 6-1 victory over Nevada at the Stanford Regional.
While the 2022 season did not see the Bison return to the NCAA tournament, the team did achieve yet another first. The team won the Summit League regular season title for the first time in program history, finishing with a 17-5 record in conference play which was another high for the program. In the Summit League tournament, the team fell to fourth seeded Omaha to be eliminated from the tournament.

Soccer

The North Dakota State Bison women's soccer team plays their home games at Dacotah Field nestled in between the school's training facility/basketball arena and the indoor track facility on the North side of campus.

The NDSU soccer program has only been in existence since 1995, when the program played their first season under coach Gordon Henderson in Division II. The team played at two different sites while in Division II. The Bison started at Cardinal Muench Seminary's field off of NDSU's campus. Then after the 1996 season, the team moved on campus for the first time playing on a field part of the Ellig Sports Complex on the northwest side of campus.

While in Division II, the team played in their first and only Division II tournament. In the 1999 season, the Bison placed second in the North Central Conference regular season. Since the conference did not have a full-league tournament, the top two teams were good enough to make the full Division II tournament. After that, the NCC started a conference tournament, in 2000 NDSU was the runner-up in the final game and missed the national tournament. Between that season and 2004, the Bison wouldn't finish high enough to make the conference tournament and did not see another Division II tournament. After the 2003 season, NDSU started their reclassification to Division I. During their reclassification years, the Bison started as Division I independents, joined the United Soccer Conference, and then finally joined the Summit League which has served as their conference of the future. 

Starting in 2008, the Bison emerged from reclassification and finished 7th in the Summit League and missed the conference tournament. But then in 2009, the team made their first Summit League tournament, and lost in the championship game.

In 2010, the Bison women's soccer team achieved the program's first NCAA tournament bid with a victory over Western Illinois in the Summit League tournament final.

Since that magical 2010 season, NDSU would make the conference tournament 8 consecutive seasons, which included 4 runner-ups. However, the team could not get over the hump of winning the final game and hasn't reached a Division I tournament since 2010. 

Under current head coach Mike Regan, the Bison have made two Summit League tournaments in his 5 seasons in Fargo, including 3 straight seasons of missing the tournament.

Mascot 

"Thundar" is the official mascot of NDSU athletics. The mascot, which resembles the American Bison, comes from the term "thundering herd," a nickname given to NDSU athletic teams since changing its name from "Aggies" to "Bison" in 1919. While some form of a "Bison Mascot" has been used at NDSU athletic events since the mid-1960s, "Thundar" did not become the official mascot of the university until 1991.

Media
NDSU athletics radio coverage rights are held by Radio FM Media with games also airing on the 24-station Bison Radio Network. TV rights for the Bison are held by Forum Communications, a Fargo-based communications company that owns TV stations affiliated with ABC, for all sports.

In addition to broadcast rights, the NDSU Bison also receive dedicated print coverage in Bison Illustrated. The monthly magazine brings readers behind the scenes coverage of NDSU teams, players, coaches, administration, and alumni. The magazine is distributed free of charge in locations around the Fargo-Moorhead area and is available via paid subscription for out-of-state readers.

References

External links